Growth arrest – specific 6, also known as GAS6, is a human gene coding for the GAS6 protein. It is similar to the Protein S with the same domain organization and 43% amino acid identity. It was originally found as a gene upregulated by growth arrested fibroblasts.

Function 

Gas6 is a gamma-carboxyglutamic acid (Gla) domain-containing protein thought to be involved in the stimulation of cell proliferation.

Interactions 

Gas6 has been shown to interact with AXL receptor tyrosine kinase, MerTK and TYRO3.

The  presence of Gla needs a vitamin K-dependent enzymatic reaction that carboxylates the gamma carbon of certain glutamic residues of the protein during its production in the endoplasmic reticulum. The action of vitamin K is essential on GAS6 function.

References

Further reading